The Buguruslan constituency (No.143) is a Russian legislative constituency in Orenburg Oblast. Until 2007 the constituency covered western Orenburg Oblast; however, in 2016 the constituency took parts of Orenburg and was reconfigured to northwestern Orenburg Oblast.

Members elected

Election results

1993

|-
! colspan=2 style="background-color:#E9E9E9;text-align:left;vertical-align:top;" |Candidate
! style="background-color:#E9E9E9;text-align:left;vertical-align:top;" |Party
! style="background-color:#E9E9E9;text-align:right;" |Votes
! style="background-color:#E9E9E9;text-align:right;" |%
|-
|style="background-color:"|
|align=left|Aleksey Chernyshyov
|align=left|Agrarian Party
|
|38.66%
|-
|style="background-color:#0085BE"|
|align=left|Larisa Nuzhdina
|align=left|Choice of Russia
| -
|15.90%
|-
| colspan="5" style="background-color:#E9E9E9;"|
|- style="font-weight:bold"
| colspan="3" style="text-align:left;" | Total
| 
| 100%
|-
| colspan="5" style="background-color:#E9E9E9;"|
|- style="font-weight:bold"
| colspan="4" |Source:
|
|}

1995

|-
! colspan=2 style="background-color:#E9E9E9;text-align:left;vertical-align:top;" |Candidate
! style="background-color:#E9E9E9;text-align:left;vertical-align:top;" |Party
! style="background-color:#E9E9E9;text-align:right;" |Votes
! style="background-color:#E9E9E9;text-align:right;" |%
|-
|style="background-color:"|
|align=left|Aleksey Chernyshyov (incumbent)
|align=left|Agrarian Party
|
|44.47%
|-
|style="background-color:#2C299A"|
|align=left|Nikolay Krendelev
|align=left|Congress of Russian Communities
|
|11.10%
|-
|style="background-color:"|
|align=left|Aleksandr Bzhezovsky
|align=left|Independent
|
|7.43%
|-
|style="background-color:#1C1A0D"|
|align=left|Tatyana Titova
|align=left|Forward, Russia!
|
|7.13%
|-
|style="background-color:"|
|align=left|Nikolay Biskayev
|align=left|Liberal Democratic Party
|
|4.89%
|-
|style="background-color:#DD137B"|
|align=left|Aleksandr Lukonin
|align=left|Social Democrats
|
|4.22%
|-
|style="background-color:"|
|align=left|Aleksandr Vasyakin
|align=left|Independent
|
|3.26%
|-
|style="background-color:#1A1A1A"|
|align=left|Vladimir Kireyev
|align=left|Stanislav Govorukhin Bloc
|
|2.34%
|-
|style="background-color:"|
|align=left|Yury Fomin
|align=left|Independent
|
|2.16%
|-
|style="background-color:#000000"|
|colspan=2 |against all
|
|9.57%
|-
| colspan="5" style="background-color:#E9E9E9;"|
|- style="font-weight:bold"
| colspan="3" style="text-align:left;" | Total
| 
| 100%
|-
| colspan="5" style="background-color:#E9E9E9;"|
|- style="font-weight:bold"
| colspan="4" |Source:
|
|}

1999

|-
! colspan=2 style="background-color:#E9E9E9;text-align:left;vertical-align:top;" |Candidate
! style="background-color:#E9E9E9;text-align:left;vertical-align:top;" |Party
! style="background-color:#E9E9E9;text-align:right;" |Votes
! style="background-color:#E9E9E9;text-align:right;" |%
|-
|style="background-color:"|
|align=left|Rem Khramov
|align=left|Independent
|
|52.32%
|-
|style="background-color:"|
|align=left|Vladimir Yeremin
|align=left|Independent
|
|27.20%
|-
|style="background-color:#FCCA19"|
|align=left|Boris Sobolev
|align=left|Congress of Russian Communities-Yury Boldyrev Movement
|
|4.21%
|-
|style="background-color:"|
|align=left|Dmitry Semenov
|align=left|Independent
|
|3.59%
|-
|style="background-color:#000000"|
|colspan=2 |against all
|
|9.10%
|-
| colspan="5" style="background-color:#E9E9E9;"|
|- style="font-weight:bold"
| colspan="3" style="text-align:left;" | Total
| 
| 100%
|-
| colspan="5" style="background-color:#E9E9E9;"|
|- style="font-weight:bold"
| colspan="4" |Source:
|
|}

2003

|-
! colspan=2 style="background-color:#E9E9E9;text-align:left;vertical-align:top;" |Candidate
! style="background-color:#E9E9E9;text-align:left;vertical-align:top;" |Party
! style="background-color:#E9E9E9;text-align:right;" |Votes
! style="background-color:#E9E9E9;text-align:right;" |%
|-
|style="background-color:"|
|align=left|Rem Khramov (incumbent)
|align=left|United Russia
|
|23.11%
|-
|style="background-color:"|
|align=left|Vladimir Grabovsky
|align=left|Independent
|
|11.40%
|-
|style="background-color:"|
|align=left|Aleksey Spiridonov
|align=left|Independent
|
|10.66%
|-
|style="background-color:"|
|align=left|Aleksandr Zhalybin
|align=left|Independent
|
|9.68%
|-
|style="background-color:"|
|align=left|Aleksandr Soluyanov
|align=left|Independent
|
|7.40%
|-
|style="background-color:"|
|align=left|Arman Davletlyarov
|align=left|Independent
|
|6.68%
|-
|style="background-color:"|
|align=left|Aleksandr Martynov
|align=left|Agrarian Party
|
|5.76%
|-
|style="background-color:"|
|align=left|Yury Shibin
|align=left|Independent
|
|4.74%
|-
|style="background-color:"|
|align=left|Aleksandr Glotov
|align=left|Liberal Democratic Party
|
|2.60%
|-
|style="background-color:#164C8C"|
|align=left|Yegor Belov
|align=left|United Russian Party Rus'
|
|2.59%
|-
|style="background-color:#7C73CC"|
|align=left|Anatoly Lutikov
|align=left|Great Russia – Eurasian Union
|
|2.16%
|-
|style="background-color:#000000"|
|colspan=2 |against all
|
|10.41%
|-
| colspan="5" style="background-color:#E9E9E9;"|
|- style="font-weight:bold"
| colspan="3" style="text-align:left;" | Total
| 
| 100%
|-
| colspan="5" style="background-color:#E9E9E9;"|
|- style="font-weight:bold"
| colspan="4" |Source:
|
|}

2016

|-
! colspan=2 style="background-color:#E9E9E9;text-align:left;vertical-align:top;" |Candidate
! style="background-color:#E9E9E9;text-align:left;vertical-align:top;" |Party
! style="background-color:#E9E9E9;text-align:right;" |Votes
! style="background-color:#E9E9E9;text-align:right;" |%
|-
|style="background-color: " |
|align=left|Igor Sukharev
|align=left|United Russia
|
|41.29%
|-
|style="background-color:"|
|align=left|Sergey Katasonov
|align=left|Liberal Democratic Party
|
|23.73%
|-
|style="background-color:"|
|align=left|Semyon Uralov
|align=left|Communist Party
|
|13.27%
|-
|style="background-color:"|
|align=left|Faik Asyayev
|align=left|A Just Russia
|
|5.87%
|-
|style="background:"| 
|align=left|Nurlan Munzhasarov
|align=left|Communists of Russia
|
|4.47%
|-
|style="background-color:"|
|align=left|Tatyana Golovina
|align=left|Rodina
|
|1.99%
|-
|style="background:"| 
|align=left|Irina Klimova
|align=left|People's Freedom Party
|
|1.93%
|-
|style="background:"| 
|align=left|Maksim Shchepinov
|align=left|Patriots of Russia
|
|1.68%
|-
|style="background:"| 
|align=left|Georgi Lazarov
|align=left|Yabloko
|
|1.41%
|-
|style="background-color:"|
|align=left|Didar Turshinov
|align=left|Party of Growth
|
|0.91%
|-
| colspan="5" style="background-color:#E9E9E9;"|
|- style="font-weight:bold"
| colspan="3" style="text-align:left;" | Total
| 
| 100%
|-
| colspan="5" style="background-color:#E9E9E9;"|
|- style="font-weight:bold"
| colspan="4" |Source:
|
|}

2021

|-
! colspan=2 style="background-color:#E9E9E9;text-align:left;vertical-align:top;" |Candidate
! style="background-color:#E9E9E9;text-align:left;vertical-align:top;" |Party
! style="background-color:#E9E9E9;text-align:right;" |Votes
! style="background-color:#E9E9E9;text-align:right;" |%
|-
|style="background-color: " |
|align=left|Oleg Dimov
|align=left|United Russia
|
|42.05%
|-
|style="background-color:"|
|align=left|Vladimir Turchin
|align=left|Communist Party
|
|23.58%
|-
|style="background-color:"|
|align=left|Oksana Nabatchikova
|align=left|A Just Russia — For Truth
|
|9.26%
|-
|style="background-color:"|
|align=left|Ivan Dubinin
|align=left|Liberal Democratic Party
|
|6.50%
|-
|style="background-color: " |
|align=left|Svetlana Gabdulkhakova
|align=left|New People
|
|6.19%
|-
|style="background-color: "|
|align=left|Kristina Rodina
|align=left|Party of Pensioners
|
|5.74%
|-
|style="background: "| 
|align=left|Vladimir Kislinsky
|align=left|Yabloko
|
|1.72%
|-
| colspan="5" style="background-color:#E9E9E9;"|
|- style="font-weight:bold"
| colspan="3" style="text-align:left;" | Total
| 
| 100%
|-
| colspan="5" style="background-color:#E9E9E9;"|
|- style="font-weight:bold"
| colspan="4" |Source:
|
|}

Notes

References

Russian legislative constituencies
Politics of Orenburg Oblast